Pirates is a 2021 British comedy-drama film written and directed by Reggie Yates in his feature directorial debut. It stars Elliot Edusah, Reda Elazouar, Jordan Peters, Youssef Kerkour, Kassius Nelson, Rebekah Murrell, Aaron Shosanya, Tosin Cole, and Shiloh Coke. The film was released in cinemas by Picturehouse Entertainment on 26 November 2021. It received critical acclaim.

Premise
In 1999, three friends—Cappo, Kidda and Two Tonne—embark on a mission to attend a New Year's party.

Cast
 Elliot Edusah as Cappo
 Reda Elazouar as Kidda
 Jordan Peters as Two Tonne
 Youssef Kerkour as Uncle Ibbs
 Kassius Nelson as Sophie
 Rebekah Murrell as Kelly
 Aaron Shosanya as Megaman
 Tosin Cole as Clips
 Shiloh Coke as Princess

Reception

Box office
In the United Kingdom, the film earned $72,008 in its opening weekend, and a total of $133,508 by the end of its run.

Critical response
On the review aggregator website Rotten Tomatoes, 100% of 22 critics' reviews are positive, with an average rating of 6.8/10. Metacritic, which uses a weighted average, assigned the film a score of 72 out of 100 based on 6 critics, indicating "generally favorable reviews".

References

External links
 
 
 

BBC Film films
British comedy-drama films
British Film Institute films
Films about friendship
Films about parties
Films set in 1999
2020s English-language films
2020s British films